Silicon Beach Fest is the name for a conference featuring both startup and Hollywood entertainment companies, based in Los Angeles, California, United States. Silicon Beach Fest was the "first time that local incubators, accelerators, digital media shops, and investors city-wide have gathered together to examine the burgeoning tech scene in L.A."

The term "Silicon Beach" has been popularly used by the media when referring to LA's growing startup and tech scene.  Many of the panels and workshops at the conference feature speakers from media companies and startups who are innovating in digital and entrepreneurial activity, and reflect the unique nature of LA's tech scene.

The first Silicon Beach Fest was held June 21–23, 2012 at more than a dozen venues in Santa Monica and Venice. Speakers included heads of LA-based accelerators, VCs, agencies, and dozens of startup CEOs and executives from Silicon Beach companies, including BeachMint, PageWoo, PromoJam, and FilmBreak.   The Silicon Beach Fest also featured a Hackathon, and dozens of female leaders   in LA's tech scene. LA mayoral candidate Eric Garcetti delivered the opening keynote.

The second Silicon Beach Fest was held November 9, 2012 in Hollywood, and featured additional startups and speakers.  This Hollywood focused event featured panels with pitch sessions where attendees were encouraged to pitch their startup or script ideas to the speakers.

The third Silicon Beach Fest was scheduled to take place June 19–22, 2013 in Los Angeles.

The Silicon Beach Fest series has been covered by Forbes, TechCrunch, PandoDaily, Huffington Post, Women 2.0, and other national and local press.

Silicon Beach Fest is created by Digital LA, a digital entertainment networking group based in Los Angeles.

Startup show case pitches

2013

Nov 2013 Best Pitch

Judges
 
 Howard Marks, Start Engine, co-founder
 Chirag Chotalia, Pritzker Group Venture Capital, Vice President
 Janet Tasi Dargan, Siemer & Associates
 Scott Sangster, Organic Startup, President
 Arteen Arabshahi, Karlin Ventures, Senior Analyst
 Jon Basset, DFJ Frontier

June 2013 Best Pitch

References

Economy of Los Angeles